The Tar Heel Formation is a geologic formation in North Carolina. It preserves fossils, including amber dating back to the Cretaceous period. A locality known as Phoebus Landing, has been dated to 78.5-77.1 Ma.

Fish

Cartilaginous fish

Dinosaurs

Ornithopods 
An indeterminate hadrosauroid is known from Stokes Quarry.

Ceratopsians

Theropods 
Indeterminate theropods, ornithomimosaurs, and maniraptorans are known from Stokes Quarry.

References 

Cretaceous geology of North Carolina